Hendrik van der Linde (4 January 1932 – 3 July 2003) was a South African boxer. He competed in the men's welterweight event at the 1952 Summer Olympics.

References

1932 births
2003 deaths
South African male boxers
Olympic boxers of South Africa
Boxers at the 1952 Summer Olympics
Boxers at the 1954 British Empire and Commonwealth Games
Commonwealth Games bronze medallists for South Africa
Afrikaner people
Commonwealth Games medallists in boxing
People from Randfontein
Welterweight boxers
Sportspeople from Gauteng
Medallists at the 1954 British Empire and Commonwealth Games